Bromelina is a genus of South American anyphaenid sac spiders first described by Antônio Brescovit in 1993. it contains only three species.

References

Anyphaenidae
Araneomorphae genera
Spiders of South America
Taxa named by Antônio Brescovit